Usabiaga is a Basque surname. Notable people with this surname include:

 Ana Usabiaga (born 1990), Spanish track cyclist
 Eduardo Usabiaga y Llaguno (1891–1973), Cuban diplomat
 Irene Usabiaga (born 1993), Spanish road and track cyclist
 Javier Usabiaga Arroyo (1939–2018), Mexican businessman and politician
 José Luis Oliveros Usabiaga (born 1983), Mexican politician